SYSGO GmbH is a German information technologies company that supplies operating systems and services for embedded systems with high safety and security-related requirements, using Linux. For security-critical applications, the company offers the Hypervisor and RTOS PikeOS, an operating system for multicore processors and the foundation for intelligent devices in the Internet of Things (IoT).

As an operating system manufacturer provider, SYSGO supports companies with the formal certification of software to international standards for safety and security in markets such as aerospace and defence, industrial automation, automotive, railway, medical as well as network infrastructure. SYSGO participates in a variety of international research projects and standardisation initiatives in the area of safety and security.

History
SYSGO was founded in 1991. On the initiative of company founder Knut Degen, the company specialized in the use of Linux-based operating systems in embedded applications. In the 1990s, SYSGO worked mainly with LynxOS. In 1999, the company launched the first product of its own, a development environment for Linux-based embedded applications by the name of ELinOS.

SYSGO introduced the first version of its PikeOS real-time operating system in 2005. With hypervisor functionality integrated into its basic structure, this operating system allows multiple embedded applications with different functional safety requirements to be operated on the same processor. The current version of PikeOS can run safety-critical applications for aerospace, automotive, rail and other industrial applications.

2009 saw the market launch of a software-only implementation of an AFDX stack (Avionics Full DupleX Switched Ethernet) for Safety-Critical Ethernet in accordance with ARINC-664 Part 7, which was certified to DO-178B. In 2013, SYSGO also achieved SIL 4 certification on multicore processors for EN 50128, a European standard for safety-relevant software used in railway applications.

The first subsidiary of the company was established in Ulm in 1997, followed by Prague (2004), Paris (2005) and Rostock (2008). In 2012, SYSGO was taken over by the Thales Group of France.
In 2019 SYSGO built its new headquarters in Klein-Winternheim, near Mainz and moved in by April 2020.

Products and services
SYSGO's best-known product is PikeOS, a real-time operating system with a separation kernel-based Hypervisor, which provides multiple partitions for a variety of other operating systems and equips them with time schedules.

Other products include:
 ELinOS, a Linux operating system for embedded applications
 Safety-Critical Ethernet/AFDX, a software implementation of ARINC-664 Part 7
 Various components required for certification

The PikeOS Hypervisor forms a foundation for critical systems in which both safety and security have to be ensured. The company also offers various certification kits. These certification kits include, for example, support documentation for development and testing and, if necessary, additional safety and security information to allow the development of standards-compliant systems.

Research
SYSGO is the technical lead for the EU research project certMILS. The goal of certMILS is primarily to make a certified European MILS platform available, and thus simplify the certification of composite IT systems. The project is supported by the EU as part of the Horizon 2020 programme.

Customers and partner network
Customers include companies that are working i.a. on solutions for the Internet of Things; especially suppliers and manufacturers in the areas aerospace and defence, automotive, railway and industrial sectors who have high safety and security requirements for their applications.

References

External links

 

Companies based in Mainz
Linux companies
Software companies of Germany